Starr is an unincorporated community in Hocking County, in the U.S. state of Ohio.

History
A post office called Star was in operation between 1830 and 1916. The community was named for its location in Starr Township.

References

Unincorporated communities in Hocking County, Ohio
Unincorporated communities in Ohio